Scatopyrodes angustus is a species of beetle belonging to the family Cerambycidae.

Description
These large beetles are sexually dimorphic. The males are greenish-brown, while the females are very larger than males and have a more evident green reflection. They are commonly nocturnal and borers whose larvae feed on rotting wood or roots.

Distribution
This species can be found in Colombia, Costa Rica, Ecuador and Panama.

References
 Biolib
 Bugguide.net on Prioninae

External links
 Scatopyrodes angustus on Flickr
 Coleop-terra

Prioninae
Beetles described in 1870
Taxa named by Ernst Ludwig Taschenberg